Samuel Cooke (1847–1929) was an Australian politician.

Samuel or Sam Cooke may also refer to:

Sam Cooke (1931–1964), popular American singer
Samuel Cooke (judge) (1912–1978), English judge
Sam Cooke (model) (born 1985), English glamour model
Sam Cooke (Australian footballer) (1883–1966), Australian rules footballer
S. S. Cooke (1879–1944), college football coach
S. N. Cooke (1883–1964), Samuel Nathaniel "S. N." Cooke, English architect
Samuel Cooke and Co, oil and fuel delivery and manufacture service
Sir Samuel Cooke, 1st Baronet (died 1758), of the Cooke baronets

See also
Samuel Cook (disambiguation)
Cooke (surname)
Sam Koch, pronounced the same way